Brian Maxine (born 13 August 1938), known as 'Goldbelt', was a professional wrestler and cabaret artist. He held the British Welterweight Championship from 1969 to 1971. He won the British middleweight championship in 1971 and by briefly holding the two belts simultaneously he became the first champion at two weights since the post-war reorganisation of British titles. Maxine, who was known for his regular and flamboyant appearances in the 1970s on World of Sport, officially held the title (which was inactive). 

Maxine also recorded country and western albums, backed by Fairport Convention.

Championships and accomplishments
Joint Promotions
British Middleweight Championship (1 time)
British Welterweight Championship (1 time)

References

1938 births
English male professional wrestlers
Living people
20th-century professional wrestlers